Germaine Cellier (1909–1976) was a French perfumer. She was known for creating bold, pioneering fragrances such as Fracas and Bandit. Cellier was also one of the first prominent female perfumers, at a time when the industry was dominated by men.

Early life
Cellier was born in Bordeaux, France in 1909. In 1930, she moved to Paris to study chemistry. After obtaining her degree, she went to work as a chemist for the French company Roure Bertrand. In 1943, she left Roure to work for Colgate-Palmolive as a functional perfumer, but returned to Roure after three months.

Career
In the 1940s, Cellier met Robert Piguet, a former designer for Paul Poiret who had started his own fashion house. Piguet aspired to create young, vibrant fashions for the post-war period. In 1944, she created Bandit, one of the first leather chypres in perfumery.  Cellier used 1% isobutyl quinoline to give Bandit an intense, leathery quality.

In 1947, she created Vent Vert for the house of Balmain, which contained an overdose of galbanum, and was considered to be the first "green" perfume.

In 1948, she created Fracas, considered today to be the landmark tuberose fragrance. The formula, among other ingredients, contained Indian tuberose absolute, Tunisian orange blossom absolute, French jasmine, and Italian iris root butter.

Throughout her life, Cellier cultivated friendships with some of France's most famous figures, such as writer Jean Cocteau, actor François Périer, and Pierre Brisson, long-time editor of Le Figaro.

In 1999, Fashion Fragrances & Cosmetics, owner of the Piguet fragrances, launched re-orchestrated versions of Fracas and Bandit.

List of creations

Balenciaga
 La Fuite Des Heures (1949)

Balmain 
 Elysees 64 83 (1946)
 Vent Vert (1947)
 Jolie Madame (1953)
 Monsieur Balmain (1964)
 Miss Balmain (1967)

Robert Piguet 
 Bandit (1944)
 Visa (1945)
 Fracas (1948)
 Cravache (1963)

Nina Ricci
 Coeur Joie (1946)

References

Businesspeople from Bordeaux
1909 births
1976 deaths
French perfumers